Capital City Stadium is a stadium in Columbia, South Carolina, United States. Originally built in 1927, it is primarily used for baseball and was the home for more than 20 years of the Capital City Bombers. It is situated in the Olympia section, near the old Olympia Mill.

While playing at "The Cap" the Bombers enjoyed a rich history of success with numerous South Atlantic League Championships, including the memorable years of 1986, 1991, and 1998.

The stadium was rebuilt in 1991, but in 2005 lost its main tenant, the Bombers. The Coastal Plain League's Columbia Blowfish used the stadium from 2006 until their new stadium was opened in 2015. It had also been used for college baseball by the NCAA Division II Benedict College Tigers, but they left around the same time. Hank Aaron played his last game as a minor league player at Capital City Stadium in 1953 before moving up to the Milwaukee Braves.

In 1995, Capital City Stadium hosted a concert by Hootie & the Blowfish (with Greenville's Edwin McCain, Clemson's Cravin' Melon, and Cowboy Mouth). In 1999, there was the Rock 93.5 Fallout concert there with UK's Bush, Sponge, and Train.

On February 4, 2019, City of Columbia officials announced that the stadium would be torn down "within the next two months" though it remained standing as of June 2019 and the demolition was still in the future as of September 2019. The "closing day event" was finally announced in March 2020 for April 4, with demolition to follow. The event was then postponed due to the COVID-19 pandemic and had not been rescheduled . In October 2020, the Columbia City Council extended the deadline for developers to purchase the property until May 1, 2021, with demolition to follow.

The site developer plans to build a mixed-use development of retail and residential and restore Rocky Branch Creek, which runs through the site.

References

External links
 Capital City Stadium Views - Ball Parks of the Minor Leagues

College baseball venues in the United States
Minor league baseball venues
Buildings and structures in Columbia, South Carolina
Baseball venues in South Carolina
Sports venues in Richland County, South Carolina
1927 establishments in South Carolina
Sports venues completed in 1927